Chirnside is a hillside village in Berwickshire, Scotland,  west of Berwick-upon-Tweed and  east of Duns.

Church

The parish church at Chirnside dates from the 12th century. It was substantially rebuilt in 1878 and extensively restored and altered in 1907. The rebuildings now incorporate all of the original church(es), however the original chevron-patterned Norman doorway at the west end remains.

Dovecot aviaries
The Ninewells Doocot, in a garden adjacent to the church, is a 16th-century circular beehive type doocot (dovecot).   Not far from the manor, stands the Whitehall Doocot, rectangular-planned, and two-chamber, with stone skews defining its mono-pitched roof.

Whitehall

Below Chirnside stands the estate of Whitehall, with a Georgian manor house containing Palladian windows, which is a Listed Building. It contains a first floor music room richly decorated in Italian plasterwork. Once owned by the Hall of Dunglass family, William Hall of Whitehall (died circa 1749) was one of the Principal Clerks of the Court of Session. It passed early in the 19th century to Mitchell-Innes of Ayton Castle family who held it until the 1980s.

Since then the house and its park have passed through the hands of developers, and since 2007 the manor has been derelict and seriously at risk. The partial demolition of the back quarters of the house have left Whitehall completely open and dangerous to the public. The Georgian manor was demolished in 2015

Ninewells House
Ninewells, named for the springs that flow from the hillside into the Whiteadder Water.

It was home to several generations of Homes (later Humes) and was the childhood home, and later the summer home, of David Hume (1711–1776) philosopher, economist and writer.

The original Ninewells house was entirely rebuilt by William Burn in 1839–1841 for Elizabeth Hume in a Tudor style, but was demolished in 1954.

In the 19th century it was described as 'a handsome Tudor edifice of 1840–41, successor to an older mansion, which was the boyish home, though not the birthplace, of the historian and philosopher, David Hume (1711–76), and his occasional residence after his fame was won. It was the seat, too, of his nephew and namesake, Baron Hume (1756–1838), the eminent writer on criminal jurisprudence. The present proprietor, James Alexander Ross-Hume, Esq. (b. 1851; suc. 1864), holds  in the shire, valued at £2162 per annum'

During World War Two it was designated as a hostel for Polish and Eastern European displaced persons. Some Polish army personnel were billeted there and some also lodged with Chirnside families. Around 1942–1943 it was designated as prisoner of war camp (236).

The Ninewells Walled Garden stands on the A6437 south of the village (early 19th century).

Billie Castle
A castle of the Rentons, it was attacked several times in the 16th century.

It was destroyed, along with Bonkle and Blanerne Castle during Hereford's Raid of 1544, part of The Rough Wooing of Scotland. It was restored prior to being abandoned in the 18th century. It was a ruin by 1834.

It appears to have consisted of an oblong tower house, with walls and a moat. There are also the remains of lime kilns.

School
Chirnside Primary School, 1937, by architects Messrs Reid & Forbes, is set into a hillside, and being white, can be seen for miles around.

Paper Mill
The Chirnside Bridge Paper Mill, now a large manufacturer, is a survivor from an earlier era. Originally constructed in 1842 and 1857 by David Cousin (also responsible for Dean Cemetery), with additions in 1897, and reductions in 1971–1973. The Italianate administrative block was built as a house for the owner of the mill. There was an earlier mill and house on the site, and the porter's lodge, now a store, is a Gothic octagonal single–storey–and–basement building which probably dates from this period.

Berwickshire Railway
Chirnside had a railway station on the North British Railway's Berwickshire Railway (opened 1863), in the hamlet of Chirnsidebridge. The railway line ran from Reston to Earlston, joining the East Coast Main Line to the Waverley Line.
A five span rounded arch railway bridge was built over the Whiteadder Water in 1863 to carry the railway.

Chirnside Railway Station was closed to passenger traffic 10 September 1951. Freight continued until 19 July 1965. The station building still stands, currently used for storing agricultural supplies.

Dialect of Chirnside
The distinctive traditional dialect of the Scots language that is spoken in Chirnside was the subject of a study by Swiss dialectologist Paul Wettstein, published in 1942. In the dialect Chirnside is pronounced "Churn-side".

Sport
The local football team, Chirnside F.C., plays in the Border Amateur league and appeared nine times in the Scottish Cup between 1935 and 1966.

Notable people
David Hume, the Scottish Enlightenment philosopher, lived in Ninewells House, just south of the village (see below). His nephew, the noted Scottish jurist David, later Baron Hume, was baptised at Chirnside in 1757.

Chirnside is also the final resting place of Jim Clark, former world champion Formula One racing-car driver. Close to the churchyard in which Clark is buried, there is a memorial plaque and clock at the side of the main road through the village. The Jim Clark Motorsport Museum can be found in Duns.

Joelle Murray, Scottish internationalist and Hibs footballer, is from the village.

Liam Craig, the former footballer, is from the village.

Near the kirk once stood a tower house (demolished in the 18th century), built by the Earl of Dunbar, once the superior here.

See also

List of places in the Scottish Borders
List of places in East Lothian
List of places in Edinburgh
List of places in Midlothian
List of places in West Lothian
List of places in Scotland
 History of Scotland
 Timeline of Scottish history
 Scotland in the Early Middle Ages
 Scotland in the High Middle Ages
 Scotland in the Late Middle Ages
 Economic history of Scotland
 Scottish Marches 
 Scottish Borders
 Anglo-Scottish border
 Debatable Lands
 Border Reivers
 List of castles in Scotland
 Borders Family History Society
 Clan Home
 Climate of Scotland
 Geography of Scotland
 Geology of Scotland

References

1 The Buildings of Scotland - Borders, by Kitty Cruft, John Dunbar and Richard Fawcett, Yale University Press, 2006, 

2 Lost Houses of Scotland, by M.Binney, J.Harris, and E.Winnington, for SAVE Britain's Heritage, London, July 1980, 

3 Refer: Borders and Berwick by Charles A Strang, Rutland Press, 1994, 

4 F.H. Groome, Ordnance Gazetteer of Scotland (1882-4)

External links

RCAHMS: Chirnside
SCRAN: Chirnside Bridge
Chirnside Community Council website

Berwickshire
Villages in the Scottish Borders
Lime kilns in Scotland